Khorrami Rural District is a rural district (dehestan) in the Central District of Khorrambid County, Fars Province, Iran. At the 2006 census, its population was 1,218, in 277 families.  The rural district has 19 villages.

References 

Rural Districts of Fars Province
Khorrambid County